Ralph S. "Mose" Barkman (September 22, 1907 – December 9, 1998) was an American football player. 

A New Jersey native, he played prep football at Roxbury High School. He then played college football as a halfback for Schuylkill College from 1925 to 1928 and was the captain of the school's 1928 football team. Known as "the boy with the ball-bearing hips", he reportedly gained over 1,000 yards for Schuylkill in nine games during the 1927 season. 

He also played professional football in the National Football League (NFL) as a back for the Orange Tornadoes. He appeared in eight NFL games, four as a starter, during the 1929 season.

References

1907 births
1998 deaths
Orange Tornadoes players
People from Chester Township, New Jersey
Players of American football from New Jersey
Sportspeople from Morris County, New Jersey
Albright Lions football players